Vos estis lux mundi ('You are the light of the world') is a motu proprio by Pope Francis, promulgated on 9 May 2019. It establishes new procedural norms to combat sexual abuse and ensure that bishops and religious superiors are held accountable for their actions. It establishes universal norms, which apply to the whole church. The law is effective for a three-year experimental period (ad experimentum), coming into force on 1 June 2019.

In its preamble, Pope Francis affirms that:

The document was issued three months after the sexual abuse summit convened by Pope Francis at the Vatican in February 2019.

Crimes covered
The new norms apply to the crimes of: 

 sexual abuse, both of minors and adults, when committed by violence or threat or through abuse of authority; 
 sexual abuse of minors under 18 years of age; 
 sexual abuse of vulnerable persons, understood as "any person in a state of infirmity, physical or mental deficiency, or deprivation of personal liberty which, in fact, even occasionally, limits their ability to understand or to want or otherwise resist the offence"; 
 the production, exhibition, possession or distribution of child pornography;
 the recruitment of or inducement of a minor or a vulnerable person to participate in pornographic exhibitions.

when committed by clerics (bishops, priests or deacons) or by members of institutes of consecrated life and societies of apostolic life (religious brothers or sisters), as well as the cover-up of such crimes, when committed by a bishop or by a supreme moderator of a religious congregation.

The norms contained in Vos estis lux mundi are procedural in nature, setting up a reporting system. The motu proprio does not introduce new penalties. The crimes are therefore to be punished in accordance with existing canon provisions.

According to J. D. Flynn:

Diocesan reporting mechanisms
The law mandates that each diocese in the world sets up, by June 2020, "one or more public, stable and easily accessible systems for submission of reports" concerning sexual abuse. As noted by Andrea Tornielli, "the legislation does not specify what these "systems" consist of, because it leaves operational choices to the diocese; and these may differ according to various cultures and local conditions".

Reporting obligations
The law mandates that clerics and religious report to ecclesiastical authority whenever they have "notice of, or well-founded motives to believe that" some sexual abuse or cover-up has been committed. In addition, Vos estis lux mundi encourages all laypersons to report clerical sexual abuse and its cover-up to the competent ecclesiastical authorities. 

Vos estis lux mundi does not require clerics to report to civil authorities. However, it underlines that the obligation to report to the ecclesiastical authority does not interfere with, nor change, any reporting obligation that may exist in each countries’ legislation. Pursuant to article 19, the norms "apply without prejudice to the rights and obligations established in each place by state laws, particularly those concerning any reporting obligations to the competent civil authorities".

Reports against bishops and lay involvement
If there is an allegation against one of the suffragan bishops in an ecclesiastical province that is not manifestly false, the metropolitan archbishop will conduct an investigation with a mandate of the Holy See. If the metropolitan himself is the accused, the report is handled by the bishop of the suffragan diocese with the greatest seniority of appointment. Thereafter, the metropolitan or the person in charge of the investigation sends the Holy See, every thirty days, a status report on the preliminary investigation, which normally should be completed within ninety days.

In conducting the investigations, the metropolitan can avail himself of the help of qualified persons, both lay and clerical, according to "the needs of the individual case and, in particular, taking into account the cooperation that can be offered by the lay faithful" even if the ultimate responsibility for investigations remains with the metropolitan. To facilitate this task, episcopal conferences and dioceses may prepare lists of qualified persons willing to collaborate in the investigations.

At the conclusion of the investigation, the metropolitan forwards the results to the competent Vatican dicastery, which will then proceed "in accordance with the law provided for the specific case," acting on the basis of already existing canonical norms. If necessary, on the basis of the preliminary investigation, the Holy See can immediately impose restrictive measures on the person under investigation.

If the metropolitan or the bishop responsible for the investigation executes it poorly, he himself could be investigated for cover-up.

The canon lawyer J. D. Flynn has observed that:

Protection for the accused, victims, and whistleblowers
Pursuant to art. 4, whoever reports a case of sexual abuse or coverup cannot be subjected to "prejudice, retaliation or discrimination" because of what they report. Moreover, the reporter and the victims cannot be required to keep silence about the facts. Vos estis lux mundi also provides that the victims and their families must be treated with dignity and respect, must be welcomed, listened to and supported, and must be offered appropriate spiritual, medical and psychological assistance.  However, the innocence of the accused must be presumed and the accused must be given the chance to defend him/herself and to receive legal counsel.

Reactions
According to Cardinal Daniel DiNardo, President of the United States Conference of Catholic Bishops:

According to Cardinal Seán Patrick O'Malley, President of the Pontifical Commission for the Protection of Minors:

According to the canonist Kurt Martens:

In an official statement, the Survivors Network of those Abused by Priests noted some positive elements in Vos estis lux mundi but considered it lacking, particularly regarding the reporting obligations to civil authorities:

See also 

 Pascite gregem Dei

References

External links
English text of Vos estis lux mundi, Vatican.va

Catholic penal canon law
Catholic Church sexual abuse scandals
Motu proprio of Pope Francis
Catholic procedural canon law
2019 in law